Gamle Eirikssen (c. 910-955) (Old Norse: Gamli Eiríksson) was a 10th-century Norwegian  ruler.

He was born about 910 in Norway. He was the eldest son of King Eric Bloodaxe and his Queen Gunnhild. He was named after Gunhild's father, the Danish king Gorm the Old (Gorm den Gamle).  Gamle is said to have died in 955  near the village of Nedre Frei during the Battle of Rastarkalv on the island of Frei in Nordmøre.

References

910s births
955 deaths
Year of birth uncertain

10th-century Norwegian monarchs
Vikings killed in battle
Fairhair dynasty
Monarchs killed in action